Jackie Schaffer (née Marcus) is an American screenwriter.

Filmography
 EuroTrip (2004) (producer)
 Trailer Park Boys: The Movie  (executive producer 2006)
 Disturbia (2007) (producer)
 Worst Enemy (2010) (executive producer)
 The League (45 episodes as executive producer and writer 2009-2012, 5 as director 2010-2012)

References

External links

 Profile of Jackie Shaffer in Harper's Bazaar
 The League – Series Creators Jeff and Jackie Schaffer Talk Season Two!, Eclipse Magazine, December 15, 2010
 For the creators of 'The League' art hilariously imitates life, Digital Journal, October 12, 2012
 Schaffers deliver baby, ‘League’ season, Tribune Chronicle, October 12, 2012
 The League' Creators on 'Terrible Things' That Inspire Them (Q&A), The Hollywood Reporter, December 7, 2012

Living people

Year of birth missing (living people)
American film producers
American women film producers
American television writers
American women television writers